State of the Art is a studio album by South Korean boy band Shinhwa. It was released on May 11, 2006, by  Good Entertainment, and represents the group's eighth major album release (tenth overall). It was the third best-selling album of 2006 in South Korea with over 215,000 copies.

Composition and recording
State of the Art twelve tracks.  It was recorded at GoodSound Studio, Rui Studio, Silk Studio, Eungeon (은건) Studio, Dream Factory, and Momo Studio in 2006.  Shinhwa member Lee Minwoo composed the lyrics for the song "Paradise", and member Eric Mun composed the rap lyrics for all songs, alongside David Kim.

Singles and music videos
The music video for "Once in a Lifetime", was directed by Cho Soo-hyun, who also directed the music video for Psy's "Gangnam Style" and "Gentleman"; and also the music video for "This Love" from Shinhwa's The Classic album in 2013.

Sales and reception
The album debuted on the Recording Industry Association Korea (RIAK) chart for the month of July 2006, with 161,452 copies sold  The album finished 2006 at number 3 on South Korea's year-end charts, with total sales of 215,641 copies.

Personnel
Information is adapted from the liner notes of State of the Art (Special Edition):
 Park Kwun-young – producer
 Shinhwa – co-producer
 Lee Jang-eon – co-producer
 Park Bong-gu – music producer
 Park Hyeok – sound engineer
 Choi Hyo-young – mastering
 Sam Lee – guitar ("Thanks!", "Doobob", "Chance", "Why Me...")
 Ko Tae-young – guitar ("Your Man", "Once in a Lifetime", "Throw My Fist", "Midnight Girl (Pop Ballad Ver.)")
 Park Su-won – guitar ("Highway Star")
 Hong Joon-ho – guitar ("Midnight Girl", "You're My Everything")
 Cho Joon-soo – bass ("Midnight Girl (Pop Ballad Ver.)"
 K-Strings – strings ("Weak Man", "Once in a Lifetime", "Throw My Fist", "Why Me...")
 Shin Min – string arrangement ("Weak Man", "Why Me...")
 Lee Na-il – string arrangement ("Once in a Lifetime", "Throw My Fist")
 Ryu Hyeong-seob – string arrangement ("Throw My Fist")
 Hwang Seong-jae – programming, keyboards ("Thanks!")
 Jang Ji-won – keyboards ("Once in a Lifetime", "Midnight Girl (Pop Ballad Ver.)")
 Kang Su-hyo – drums ("Once in a Lifetime")
 Jang Sang-hyeon – drums ("Midnight Girl (Pop Ballad Ver.)")

Track listing
Information is adapted from the liner notes of State of the Art (Special Edition):

Charts and sales

Monthly charts

Yearly charts

Sales

Release history
A special edition version of State of the Art also released, containing bonus remix tracks of "Throw My Fist" and "Midnight Girl" and a DVD with behind-the-scenes footage.  The album was released in Taiwan on October 5, 2006, by Universal Music Taiwan in two versions, including one with a bonus DVD.

References

2006 albums
Shinhwa albums
Universal Music Taiwan albums